The Liability of trustees inter se in English law governs in what circumstances and to what extent a trustee in English trust law is liable for the acts and defaults of their co-trustees under English Law. In general trustees are  under a duty to act jointly and have authority to act individually only if the trust instrument so provides. In principle therefore each trustee has an equal say in the management of the trust property and therefore in the event of a breach the trustees are jointly and severally liable  for their actions.

However, trustees are only liable for their own breach and so a unilateral action by one trustee that constitutes a breach of trust will not engage the liability of another trustee's.

Equitable principles still thought to survive
In no situations where joint and several liability is engaged contribution claims between parties are governed by the operation of the Civil Liability (Contribution) Act 1978, but, in addition there remain several equitable principles developed by the chancery division of the English Courts that are thought to remain in effect. Such principles are likely to influence the court in their interpretation of the 1978 Act.

Solicitor Trustees
In Head v Gould was a case in English trust law concerning the indemnity of trustees inter se for a breach of a trust.  Where a trustee has committed a breach of trust relying on the professional advice of a fellow solicitor trustee they were entitled to be indemnified by virtue of that reliance . It is one of the few common law situations concerning inter-trustee indemnity that is still thought to apply following the passing of the Civil Liability (Contribution) Act 1978. The rise of professional trustee companies has led to the suggestion that it may become of significant case law in the future.

Facts 
Miss Head and Mrs. Gould were appointed trustees of certain marriage settlements, Mrs. Gould was a "Solicitor-Trustee". The trustees sold the house that was part of the trust property and in breach of trust paid the proceeds of the sale to a life tenant. On the other hand, Miss Head sought to claim that she was indemnified because of the status of her co-trustee as a solicitor. Miss Head claimed that she had acted in reliance on the professional advice of Gould. Upon investigation, there was no evidence that that was the cause and so Miss Head's claim to indemnity her husband was declined.

However; in giving judgment by J. Kekewich, it was considered earlier an equitable case law and also considered that "I do not myself think that Bryne Jacob or any other judges ever intended to hold that a man is bound to indemnify himself of his co-trustees against loss merely because he was a solicitor, when that co-trustee was an active participant in the breach of trust complained of, and is not proved to have participated merely in consequence of the advice and control of the solicitor."

Sole Benefit
In Bahin v Hughes the situation where a sole trustee benefited from the breach of trust was considered by High Court. In that case there were two trustees, one of whom was passive in the management of the trust, one of those trustees acted honestly but in breach of the trust terms in making an investment. The passive trustee was unsuccessful in claiming an indemnity on the basis that it had been the actions of the other trustee that had caused the breach of trust. Cotton LJ felt that it would be wrong to punish a trustee who had acted honestly more than a trustee who had failed to act at all.

However, it is not clear exactly how far this principle can be extended and it is generally thought that Bahin v Huges should be treated with caution .

Notes

English trusts law
Public liability